Thomas Jefferson High School (colloquially, Jefferson High School or "Jeff") is a public high school in Portland, Oregon, United States, founded in 1908.

History

Jefferson opened in September 1908, and was initially named Albina High School, but was renamed Jefferson High School in early 1909. The school was not ready in 1908, but was opened early due to overcrowding. It was finished on February 6, 1910. The Oregonian reported in January 1922 that Jefferson was the largest high school in Portland, with 2,063 students. Hopkin Jenkins was principal at Jefferson from its opening until June 1940.

Due to the baby boom and passing of a $25 million building levy by the school district in 1947, a new high school was slated.

In September 1991, "at least six fires" were set at the school by an arsonist.

On January 7, 2008, Mayor Potter relocated City Hall to Jefferson for a week. Potter held a City Council meeting and delivered the State of the City address there. The aim was stated to be to "give students, parents and educators a first hand lesson in how government really works - and to showcase the opportunities, successes and challenges facing every school in Portland's six public school districts."

School profile

In 2009–10, Jefferson was the only school in Oregon to have a majority of African American students. As of 2018, the school's ethnic demographics were 41% African American, 28% European American, 17% Hispanic, 10% Two or more races, 2% Asian, 2% Hawaiian, and 1% American Indian.

In 2018, 84% of the school's seniors received a high school diploma, higher than the state average of 80%.

In September 2011, all freshman students were required to participate in the Middle College for Advanced Studies. This program was explained as follows:

Freshmen and sophomores focus on their core subjects at Jefferson.  They learn skills such as study habits and organization to prepare them for college coursework and move through classes in groups — or academies - with the same set of teachers.

As students are ready, they move to college prep classes at Jefferson and college courses at Portland Community College Cascade Campus, mostly in their junior and senior years.  College pathways range from preparation for a four-year college to careers such as emergency medical technician, medical assistant, firefighter, and heating, ventilation and cooling technician.

College coursework is offered at no cost to Jefferson students. Students who receive special education services may participate in the Middle College as recommended by their individualized education plan teams.

Students who are learning English may participate in the Middle College by taking credit-bearing ESOL courses and other courses consistent with their English language level.

Counselors and advisers at Portland Community College and Jefferson closely support students as they progress. Self Enhancement, Inc., a youth-development nonprofit, provides core support services as tutoring and mentoring to all Jefferson students.

Students earn high school diplomas from Jefferson as well as 12 to 45 college credits from Portland Community College that are transferable to other colleges and universities.

Dance program
In the mid-1970s, in an attempt to integrate the student body, Jefferson High School introduced the magnet arts program and the dance program to attract students from other Portland high school attendance areas. The dance program was founded by Mary Vinton Folberg, sister of Will Vinton (creator of Claymation). Folberg modelled the Jefferson Dance Department after the Fiorello H. LaGuardia High School of Music & Art and Performing Arts. While the magnet arts and dance program attracted some white students from other school attendance areas, some argue that this has not led to integrating the student body, and that only a small percentage of black students in this traditionally black school are able to enroll in the dance and arts programs.

The Jefferson dance program teaches different levels of a broad range of dance styles, including ballet, tap, African, modern, hip hop and jazz. Twice each school year the students' achievements are publicly showcased in recitals in the school's auditorium: one in the winter and one in the spring. Considered a foundation of many types of dance, ballet is an essential part of many dance students' educations. However, the Jefferson dance program and school-based company, the Jefferson Dancers, lacked advanced ballet training for about a decade. In the 2009 winter recital, the Jefferson Dancers performed the school's first piece en pointe in about ten years.

The Jefferson Dancers

In the late 1970s, Folberg founded the student dance company The Jefferson Dancers. Since its founding, the company has grown and changed, exposing its members to a diverse range of dance styles, including ballet, modern, African, tap, jazz and hip hop. The company's dance instructors are highly qualified and have led successful dance careers. Some instructors have continued to perform during their involvement with the Jefferson Dancers. Promising company members are awarded scholarships at each spring recital, and company auditions are held for two days each spring.

The company performs twice annually at Jefferson High School's winter and spring dance recitals, as well as throughout Portland, Oregon, and the world. The company toured in Germany in April 2009, Italy in March 2011, and China in 2013.

Athletics

Men's basketball
The men's basketball team has been one of the most successful programs in Oregon. Jefferson has produced 40 plus D1 basketball recruits in program history. Some previous democrat recruits have chosen to play at Washington, Texas, Gonzaga, Kentucky, Oregon, USC, Kansas, Michigan, and other schools. Six former players have been ranked in the top 100 in the country and Terrence Jones was named a McDonald's All American in 2010. Jefferson has won state titles in 1951, 1972, 2000, 2008, 2009, 2010, 2013, 2014, and 2017. Pat Strickland was head coach from 2009-2021, then stepped down for a year and announced he will be returning for the 2022-2023 season.

State championships
 Boys' basketball: 1951, 1972, 2000, 2008, 2009, 2010, 2013, 2014, 2017
 Girls' basketball: 2008, 2010
 Football: 1957, 1958
 Boys' swimming: 1951
 Girls' swimming: 1952, 1953
 Baseball: 1946, 1947, 1959
 Girls' tennis: 1951, 1953, 1954
 Boys' track & field: 1944, 1945, 1960, 1963
 Girls' track & field: 1984

Notable alumni

 Terry Baker, football player, 1962 Heisman Trophy winner, Los Angeles Rams
 Emery Barnes, former NFL player and politician 
 Larry Beil, football player
 Kameron Chatman, current professional basketball player. Played at Jefferson for his freshmen and sophomore years of HS.
 Dick Daniels, NFL player and executive
 Johnny Ray Gill, actor
 Joe Gordon, Baseball Hall of Famer, second baseman, New York Yankees
 Woody Green, NFL player
 Kevin Hagen, actor
 Mickey Hergert, baseball coach at Lewis & Clark College
 Terrence Jones, basketball player
 Silas Melson, basketball player
 Aaron Miles (basketball), professional basketball player & assistant coach of the Boston Celtics
 Danny Mwanga, Major League Soccer player
Virginia Patton, actress
 Mel Renfro, Pro Football Hall of Fame, Dallas Cowboys
 Terrence Ross, basketball player, Orlando Magic
 Nancy Ryles, state legislator
 Floyd Simmons, football player
 Ural Thomas, musician
 Ime Udoka, professional basketball player for the New York Knicks, Portland Trail Blazers, San Antonio Spurs. Former head coach of the Boston Celtics.
 Pete Ward, baseball player and coach
 Renée Watson, an award-winning and New York Times bestselling author of young adult novel Piecing Me Together
 Arnie Weinmeister, professional football player
 K'Zell Wesson, professional basketball player (played in Turkey, France, Germany)

See also
 Thomas Jefferson (Bitter), a statue installed on the campus in 1915

References

External links

 

High schools in Portland, Oregon
Educational institutions established in 1908
Public high schools in Oregon
Magnet schools in Oregon
1908 establishments in Oregon
Portland Public Schools (Oregon)
African-American history of Oregon